HMS Ariadne was a Leander-class frigate of the Royal Navy. She was launched in 1971, was sold to Chile in 1992 and sunk as a target hulk in 2004.

Construction
Ariadne was one of two Leander-class frigates ordered from Yarrow Shipbuilders as part of the 1967–68 construction programme for the Royal Navy, the last two ships of the class with the order announced on 29 July 1968. Ariadne was laid down at Yarrow's Scotstoun shipyard on 1 November 1969, and was launched on 10 September 1971 and completed on 10 February 1973, commissioning on 2 March 1973 at Devonport. She was the last of the Leander class to be completed. Like the rest of the Leander class, she was named after a figure of Greek mythology; Ariadne was Greek goddess of labyrinths and passions.

Displacement was  standard and  full load.

A twin 4.5-inch (113 mm) Mark 6 gun mount was fitted forward. A single Sea Cat surface-to-air missile launcher was fitted aft (on the Helicopter hangar roof), while two Oerlikon 20mm cannon provided close-in defence.  A Limbo anti-submarine mortar was fitted aft to provide a short-range anti-submarine capability, while a hangar and helicopter deck allowed a single Westland Wasp helicopter to be operated, for longer range anti-submarine and anti-surface operations. Ariadne was fitted with a large Type 965 long range air search radar on the ship's mainmast, with a Type 993 short range air/surface target indicating radar and Type 978 navigation radar carried on the ship's foremast. An MRS3 fire control system was carried to direct the 4.5-inch guns. The ship had a sonar suite of Type 184 medium range search sonar, Type 162 bottom search and Type 170 attack sonar, together with a Type 199 variable depth sonar (VDS). She had a crew of 260 officers and other ranks.

Royal Navy
In the year of her commission, Ariadne undertook a fishery protection patrol during the Second Cod War with Iceland.

Ariadne participated in the Beira Patrol. She also refuelled from an old oiler permanently moored at Gan in the Indian Ocean. Between 1975 and 1976 she was commanded by Captain Benjamin Bathurst.

In 1976, Ariadne completed a refit and the following year took part in the annual group deployment, visiting a variety of ports in South America and West Africa, as well as performing naval exercises.

In 1977, Galatea also took part in the Fleet Review, in honour of Queen Elizabeth II's Silver Jubilee. Ariadne was part of the 7th Frigate Squadron. In 1978, Ariadne joined Standing Naval Force Atlantic (STANAVFORLANT), a NATO multi-national squadron.

Ariadne was intended for modernisation, which would have included the removal of her one 4.5-in Mk.6 gun, which would have been replaced by the Exocet anti-ship missile, as well as the addition of the Sea Wolf missile, but the 1981 Defence Review by the defence minister John Nott, cancelled the modernisation for Ariadne and other Batch III Leander-class frigates. In 1981 Ariadne became the West Indies Guard Ship and, while there, performed a variety of duties in that region.

In 1983 she shadowed the Soviet cruiser Slava. It was a common practice during the Cold War, with Soviet warships quite often shadowing Royal Navy vessels in return. In 1987 Ariadne joined the 6th Frigate Squadron.

Ariadne came out of refit in Rosyth Dockyard, Fife, Scotland in 1989 and replaced   in the Dartmouth Training Squadron. During this deployment she travelled 500,000 miles and was one of the first Royal Navy warships to visit Dutch Harbour, in the Aleutian Islands, since Captain James Cook landed there in Endeavour. Between 1988 and 1990 she was commanded by Commander Adrian Johns.

Ariadne was formally adopted by Scunthorpe Borough Council on 8 March 1973. The ship's anchor is still located outside the now North Lincolnshire Council's main administrative Civic Centre, and the ship's bell is situated outside the council chamber inside the Civic Centre.

Chilean Navy
Ariadne was finally decommissioned by the Royal Navy in May 1992 and was subsequently sold to Chile, being renamed General Baquedano. She was decommissioned from the Chilean Navy in December 1998 and sunk as target in 2004.

References

Publications

 

 

Leander-class frigates
1971 ships
Leander-class frigates of the Chilean Navy
Ships sunk as targets